The Coulomb barrier, named after Coulomb's law, which is in turn named after physicist Charles-Augustin de Coulomb, is the energy barrier due to electrostatic interaction that two nuclei need to overcome so they can get close enough to undergo a  nuclear reaction.

Potential energy barrier
This energy barrier is given by the electric potential energy:

where
ε0 is the permittivity of free space;
q1, q2 are the charges of the interacting particles;
r is the interaction radius.

A positive value of U is due to a repulsive force, so interacting particles are at higher energy levels as they get closer. A negative potential energy indicates a bound state (due to an attractive force).

The Coulomb barrier increases with the atomic numbers (i.e. the number of protons) of the colliding nuclei:

where e is the elementary charge, and Zi the corresponding atomic numbers.

To overcome this barrier, nuclei have to collide at high velocities, so their kinetic energies drive them close enough for the strong interaction to take place and bind them together.

According to the kinetic theory of gases, the temperature of a gas is just a measure of the average kinetic energy of the particles in that gas. For classical ideal gases the velocity distribution of the gas particles is given by Maxwell–Boltzmann. From this distribution, the fraction of particles with a velocity high enough to overcome the Coulomb barrier can be determined.

In practice, temperatures needed to overcome the Coulomb barrier turned out to be smaller than expected due to quantum mechanical tunnelling, as established by Gamow. The consideration of barrier-penetration through tunnelling and the speed distribution gives rise to a limited range of conditions where fusion can take place, known as the Gamow window.

The absence of the Coulomb barrier enabled the discovery of the neutron by James Chadwick in 1932.

References

Nuclear physics
Nuclear fusion
Nuclear chemistry